Caroline Jordan (born 2 August 1964) is a British former field hockey player who competed in the 1988 Summer Olympics.

References

External links
 

1964 births
Living people
British female field hockey players
Olympic field hockey players of Great Britain
Field hockey players at the 1988 Summer Olympics